Sphaenorhynchus prasinus, or Bokermann's lime treefrog, is a species of frog in the family Hylidae. It is endemic to eastern and southeastern Brazil and occurs in the states of Pernambuco, Alagoas, Bahia, and Minas Gerais.

Breeding takes place in temporary ponds. It is locally very abundant, but its population is believed to decreasing, probably due to habitat loss.

References

prasinus
Amphibians of Brazil
Endemic fauna of Brazil
Amphibians described in 1973
Taxonomy articles created by Polbot